War Pony is a 2022 American drama film directed and produced by Riley Keough and Gina Gammell—in both of their respective feature directorial debuts—from a screenplay by Keough, Gammell, Franklin Sioux Bob and Bill Reddy. It stars Jojo Bapteise Whiting and Ladainian Crazy Thunder.

It had its world premiere at the 2022 Cannes Film Festival in the Un Certain Regard section on May 21, 2022 and won the Caméra d'Or, which is awarded for the best first feature film.

Plot
Follows the intertwined lives of two young Lakota boys living on the Pine Ridge Indian Reservation.

Cast
 Jojo Bapteise Whiting as Bill
 Ladainian Crazy Thunder as Matho 
 Jesse Schmockel as Echo
 Sprague Hollander as Tim
 Wilma Colhof
 Iona Red Bear
 Woodrow Lone Elk
 Ta-Yamni Long Black Cat
 Jeremy Corbin Cottier
 Ashley Shelton as Allison

Production
In 2015, while on production of American Honey, Riley Keough befriended two extras, Franklin Sioux Bob and Bill Reddy, while filming in South Dakota and later introduced them to her best friend Gina Gammell. Over the course of several years, the project began to take shape, through writing workshops, improvisation sessions, and meeting hundreds of locals in the community, to make the story authentic. The group began discussing an idea for a film revolving around two indigenous locals growing up on the Pine Ridge Indian Reservation. They began writing the script based upon Bob and Reddy's life experiences and stories they had heard, ending up with too much material, and decided to split the story between two characters, and collaborated with local producer Willi White.

Release
The film had its world premiere at the 2022 Cannes Film Festival on May 21, 2022, in the Un Certain Regard section. It won the Caméra d'Or for Best First Feature. Shortly after, Picturehouse Entertainment acquired U.K. and Irish distribution rights to the film. In March 2023, Momentum Pictures acquired U.S. distribution rights to the film. It is scheduled to be released in the United Kingdom on June 9, 2023.

Reception
 On Metacritic, the film has an average score of 69 out of 100 based on 11 reviews, indicating "generally favorable reviews".

References

External links
 

2022 films
American drama films
British drama films
2022 directorial debut films
Films about Native Americans
2020s English-language films
2020s American films
2020s British films